The 2011 Dublin Super Cup was a two-day pre-season football tournament held at the Aviva Stadium, Dublin,  Ireland. It was held on 30–31 July 2011 and featured Celtic, F.C. Internazionale, Manchester City and a League of Ireland XI,  Manchester City emerged as the winners.

Tournament rules

The format is a single table. The four competitors accrue points as follows:
 Three points for a victory
 One point for a draw
 No points for a loss
 One point for each goal scored

Results

Table

Matches

 Scorers

League of Ireland XI squad

|-
! colspan="10"  style="background:#b0d3fb; text-align:left;"|
|- style="background:#dfedfd;"

|-
! colspan="10"  style="background:#b0d3fb; text-align:left;"|
|- style="background:#dfedfd;"

|-
! colspan="9"  style="background:#b0d3fb; text-align:left;"|
|- style="background:#dfedfd;"

|}

References

External links
Official website

Association football in Dublin (city)
Irish association football friendly trophies
Super Cup
2011–12 in English football
2011–12 in Italian football
2011–12 in Scottish football
Football
July 2011 sports events in Europe